Alejandra María Bravo Hidalgo was a Chilean executive secretary and politician in the Independent Regionalist Party (PRI) until its dissolution in 2018. She served as president of the party between 2015 and 2018.

Between March 2018 and November 2019, she was Undersecretary of National Assets during the second government of Sebastián Piñera. Previously, she was a councilor for the Colina for two consecutive terms, 2000-2004 and 2004–2008.

Early life and education
She was born in Santiago de Chile, on November 6, 1964. She is the second of three siblings; the eldest, José Manuel, and the youngest, Marcela. Her mother Zunilda del Carmen Hidalgo Casanova, was a seamstress and her father Carlos Ernesto Bravo Fernández was an employee of the Social Security Service. The latter administered the Los Talavera's farm, in Chacabuco, but later they would move to the towns of El Colorado and then Esmeralda, in the district of Colina.

She studied up to fourth grade at the Esmeralda School, later going to the Peldehue school until she finished eighth grade. Her secondary education was in a school in Santiago.

She began studying Executive Secretariat at ANCAP, graduating with a mention in English. She also has a bachelor's in Social Communication from UNIACC University.

She has socio-political studies at the Foundation for Analysis and Social Studies of Madrid, she was also a scholarship holder of the Department of State in socio-political studies ( United States ), and has studied in Public Policies in Strengthening of SME projects associated with the Government Basque.

Political career
When in 1983 the rector of INACAP was changed from a Jesuit to a retired military officer, Bravo expressed her rejection and entered politics.

Coming from a family close to the right or center right, however, her mother had a certain preference for the Christian Democracy (PDC), so Bravo decided to approach that party.

Even so, it was in 1988 when Bravo would definitively join that community, after meeting Adolfo Zaldívar. She became the president of the Christian Democratic Youth (JDC) in Colina and was part of the plebiscite, in the No Pinochet, collecting registrations for the party.

Already with Patricio Aylwin as president, Bravo moved away from politics and dedicated herself to business, opening an agricultural company with her father and brother in which they invested all their assets.

She returned to politics and became the vice president of the DC headed by Zaldívar and as a councilor for Colina between 2000 and 2008. That year, she decided to run for mayor of that commune, losing to the candidate of the Independent Democratic Union (UDI) ), Mario Olavarria.

A year earlier, in 2007, Adolfo Zaldívar would be expelled from the DC after criticizing the implementation of Transantiago and together with other parliamentarians, he would form the Independent Regionalist Party (PRI). Bravo would follow him, leaving the DC and joining the PRI.

There she met her current partner, the then secretary general of the PRI, Eduardo Salas, with whom she has been since 2012 and with whom she lives.

Led by Zaldívar, Bravo gradually gained influence within the new coalition. She was vice president of the party and in 2015 she became its president, she remained in office until 2018 when she was succeeded by Eduardo Salas.

In the parliamentary elections of 2017, competed as a candidate for deputy for District No. 8, corresponding to the communes of Cerrillos, Colina, Estación Central, Lampa, Maipú, Tiltil, Pudahuel, and Quilicura, in the Santiago Metropolitan Region, but she did not get elected.

On March 11, 2018, she was appointed by President Piñera as Undersecretary of National Assets. She resigned from the position in November 2019 after controversial irregularities.

References

Chilean politicians
Living people
1964 births